"Deer" is the thirteenth single by the Bay Area collective Peach Tree Rascals released on June 23, 2020 by Homemade Projects and 10K Projects. The song is the first to be released by a record label, as opposed to a self-release.

Background and composition 
Tarrek stated that "[Joseph] and I wrote this song about celebrating the happy moments that almost feel too good to be true. … Whether it’s love, reaching a career goal, etc. - that’s what this is about." The song takes inspiration from the member's upbringings, being second-generation Americans, with the song talking about "appreciating the highs as they come." After the writing process was finished, producer Dominic Pizano was thinking of song titles when he looked outside his widow and saw a doe walking by, then thought of the name "Deer." The song has been described as a "genre-spanning canvas, flecked with sunlit, indie-pop instinct and great stripes of hip-hop-driven beats" by The Line of Best Fit.

References 

Peach Tree Rascals songs
2020 singles
2020 songs